United Counties of Murray and St Vincent was an electoral district of the Legislative Assembly in the Australian state of New South Wales from 1856 to 1859. It was named after Murray and St Vincent counties, including Canberra and Braidwood, although Braidwood and Queanbeyan were exclaves of the electoral district and formed parts of Southern Boroughs. Coastal St Vincent county (Batemans Bay and the Jervis Bay area) were included in the electoral district of St Vincent. Its only member was William Forster. Murray and St Vincent was replaced by Queanbeyan and Braidwood.

Members for United Counties of Murray and St Vincent

Election results

Notes

References

Former electoral districts of New South Wales
Constituencies established in 1856
1856 establishments in Australia
Constituencies disestablished in 1859
1859 disestablishments in Australia